GunBroker.com is an auction website based in Atlanta, Georgia, United States, specializing in the sale of firearms and related items.

History
Established in 1999, GunBroker.com is the world's largest online marketplace for firearms, ammo and accessories. GunBroker.com does not sell firearms, but facilitates transactions by bringing buyers and sellers together. Third-party sellers list items on the site, and every buyer or seller must be legally permitted to own firearms. Ownership policies and regulations are followed using licensed firearms dealers (FFLs) as transfer agents. It was founded by Steven F. Urvan, who serves as the CEO and Chief Technology Officer.

GunBroker was founded shortly after eBay changed its policies, prohibiting the auction of firearms and firearm parts (such as barrels, magazines and trigger assemblies, essentially any part involved in the firing of a gun). In 2008, Hitwise, a Web site measurement service, ranked GunBroker.com third in the United States' "Shopping and Classifieds—Auctions" category, exceeded only by eBay and eBay Motors.

Operations
An Inc. Top 5000 company, GunBroker.com is also in the top 400 of all websites as rated by Quantcast. It is the Web's largest hunting and sport shooting auction site. The site averages 1,000,000 listings for firearms, parts and accessories at any given time.

GunBroker has over six million registered users, and averages seven million site visitors per month. The site first reached $1 billion in cumulative merchandise sales 10 years after launch, and reached $2 billion in cumulative merchandise sales on November 10, 2012. GunBroker has sometimes been used to study trends in firearm sales.

Mobile
In May 2014, the site announced the addition of an iOS based mobile device application for the Apple iPhone. This joined the site's other mobile offerings of an Android-based application and a mobile device version of the site. The iOS application was removed by Apple from the Apple Store in 2018.

NASCAR sponsorship

GunBroker.com been a sponsor for various NASCAR teams since 2005. GunBroker was the primary sponsor of NASCAR Camping World Truck Series driver Jason White, driver of the No. 23 Truck from 2008-2012.  In 2013, GunBroker.com sponsored Joey Coulter in select Camping World Truck Series races.

References

External links
 

Firearm commerce
Online auction websites of the United States
American companies established in 1999
Retail companies established in 1999
Internet properties established in 1999
1999 establishments in Georgia (U.S. state)